A fans club is an organized group of fans, generally of a celebrity. Most fans clubs are run by fans who devote considerable time and resources to support them. There are also "official" fan clubs that are run by someone associated with the person or organization the club is centered on. This is the case for many musicians, sports teams, etc. 

People in a fans club usually have either a T-shirt or a pin to indicate which fans club they are a part of. All fans clubs have unique paraphernalia that are given or sold to fans to use as an indication. Barbz, who support Nicki Minaj, Hollanders, who support Tom Holland, Carats, who support Seventeen, and A.R.M.Y who support BTS are examples of a fans club.

Etymology 
The origin of the
term fan in reference to a dedicated zealot is unclear. The word may have
emerged in the 1800s, when boxing supporters were said to take a “fancy” to pugilistic
sports. Among modern sports fans, however, the title is considered a
shortened version of the word fanatic, as in “boxing fanatic,” an indication
of the dedication of fan club members.

Functions
Larger fan clubs may organize events and fundraising relating to what they are based on. In some cases, the money that is raised goes directly to fan club members or to fund the club itself.

There are two main kinds of fan clubs, there are fan clubs that do not require an official registration process and others that do. Fan clubs that do require a formal registration usually require a membership fee. Different fan clubs have different systems, however most clubs have an annual membership fee. These fees will be used to run the foundation. If the fan clubs are for certain fashion brands, they may use those fees for advertisement.

The term groupie is a slang that is commonly used in reference to fans of a particular musician, band, or celebrity who follow the group- or individual- while they are touring, or who attend as many of their public appearances as possible. The word is often used to describe female fans seeking sexual relationships with musicians. They often value musicians themselves over their music.

Groupies are more personally affiliated with the band or celebrity they follow, however fans are not affiliated as they are more reserved than groupies would be. Most fan clubs are online and fans who are a part of these clubs, do not usually get to have personal connections with whom they are fans of.

Internet

Today, many fan clubs have websites to support their efforts. Technology allows individuals in fan clubs to communicate across the world.  These sites usually have photos and information on the object of their affection. For example, a fan site dedicated to musicians might have photos, videos, discussion boards, and information on upcoming concerts.

Fan clubs are growing in number thanks to technological advances and influences on social media.

Example: Fans Club Platform

References